Hewitt House may refer to:

in the United States (by state then town)
 Edwin H. Hewitt House, Minneapolis, Minnesota, listed on the National Register of Historic Places (NRHP) in Hennepin County
 Dr. Charles Hewitt Laboratory, Red Wing, Minnesota, listed on the NRHP in Goodhue County
 Hewitt House (Enfield, New Hampshire), listed on the NRHP in Grafton County
 Austin Hewitt Home, Pulaski, Tennessee, listed on the NRHP in Giles County
 M. S. Hewitt House, Georgetown, Texas, listed on the NRHP in Williamson County
 Preslar-Hewitt Building, Taylor, Texas, listed on the NRHP in Williamson County